C215 may refer to:
 C215 (street artist), a graffiti artist from France
 C215 Viaduct, a box girder bridge in Taiwan
 Mercedes-Benz C215, a model of car